Tennis competitions at the 2015 Pan American Games in Toronto were held from July 10 to 16 at the Rexall Centre, which was known as the Canadian Tennis Centre for the duration of the games due to naming rights. A total of five events were contested (two each for men and women, and a mixed doubles event). Argentina topped the medal table, with gold medals in the men's singles and mixed doubles, while hosts Canada also achieved gold in the women's doubles event.

The second round of the 2015 Davis Cup was moved ahead one week to not conflict with the tennis competitions. Tennis competitions also began before the opening ceremony, to allow athletes to compete in both events.

Competition schedule

The following is the competition schedule for the tennis competitions:

Medal table
The following is the medal standings as of 16 June 2015.

Medalists

Participating nations
A total of 23 countries had qualified athletes.

Qualification

A total of 80 tennis players qualified to compete at the Games (48 men and 32 women). Each country was allowed to enter a maximum of three male and three female athletes (with one pair maximum in each of the doubles events).

References

 
Events at the 2015 Pan American Games
Pan American Games
2015
Tennis tournaments in Canada